François de Chevert (2 February 1695 – 24 January 1769) was a French general.

Chevert was born in Verdun, Meuse. He entered service in 1706, became major in Beauce's regiment in Toul in 1728, later in 1739 lieutenant-colonel. He distinguished himself in Flanders, Piedmont and Germany and was rewarded by a more important command, as lieutenant-colonel of a grenadier regiment. As part of the French force, he led the siege of Prague in the War of the Austrian Succession with his grenadiers in 1741 and helped defend the city against the Austrian troops. Named brigadier, he took part in the operations in the Dauphiné and Italy, most famously in the Battle of Casteldelfino, and became maréchal-de-camp in 1744.

During the campaign in the Provence, he seized the isles of Sainte-Marguerite, after which coup he was named lieutenant-general in 1748. With this title, he commanded the French flanking force at the victory of Hastenbeck. In the following year he also commanded the flanking force in the French victory at Lutterburg.

During this illustrious career in the course of which he passed through all important ranks of the hierarchy, Chevert seems to have known nothing but success, save for one small defeat at the battle of Meer (or Mehr) in 1758, where a large component of his corps consisted of green troops and militia. A simple major of a regiment, he was awarded the order of Chevalier de Saint-Louis in 1742, became commander in 1754, was decorated with the Grand Croix in 1758 and made knight of the Aigle Blanc de Pologne in the same year. He died in Paris, aged 73, holding the position of governor of Givet and Charlemont.

References 

1695 births
People from Verdun
French generals
1769 deaths
Knights of the Order of Saint Louis